The 2013 African Women's Handball Champions League was the 35th edition, organized by the African Handball Confederation, under the auspices of the International Handball Federation, the handball sport governing body. The tournament was held from October 3–12 in Marrakech, Morocco, contested by 9 teams and won by Atlético Petróleos de Luanda of Angola.

Draw

Preliminary round

Times given below are in WET UTC+0.

Group A

* Note:  Advance to quarter-finals

Group B

* Note:  Advance to quarter-finals

Knockout stage
Championship bracket

5-8th bracket

Final ranking

See also
 2014 African Women's Handball Championship

References

External links
 Official website

Africa Women's Handball Championship for Clubs Champions
Women's Handball Championship for Clubs Champions
2013 Africa Women's Handball Championship for Clubs Champions
African Women's Handball Champions League
International handball competitions hosted by Morocco